Sosiaalikeskus Satama (Harbor Social Center) was a social center in Helsinki, Finland, opened in April 2009 and evicted August 2011.

Location 
The building stood on the Kyläsaarenkatu street, in an old customs building in the central Helsinki district of Sörnäinen, which was left empty when the harbor operations moved to the Vuosaari Harbor (hence the name satama, harbor). The building had  in three stories.

The building was given to squatters by the Helsinki Board of Youth Issues in October 2008 after an exhausting series of squattings and evictions around the city. The board then paid the rent.

Eviction
After long negotiations between the centre, the Mayor, the Youth Board and the Public Works Department, the city decided to evict the building.

In August 2011, the police evicted Satama, which had been in the news due to the Romani people inhabiting it. It was demolished soon thereafter to make way for new housing development.

See also
 Lepakko

References

Buildings and structures in Helsinki
Social centres
Sörnäinen
Demolished buildings and structures in Finland